Powązki Military Cemetery is an old military cemetery located in the Żoliborz district, western part of Warsaw, Poland. The cemetery is often confused with the older Powązki Cemetery, known colloquially as "Old Powązki". The Old Powązki cemetery is located to the south-east of the military cemetery.

The military cemetery holds the graves of many who have fought and died for their country since the early 19th century, including a large number involved in the 1920 Battle of Warsaw, the September 1939 Campaign, and the ill-fated 1944 Warsaw Uprising against Nazi Germany.

History
It was founded in 1912 as an annex to the Catholic cemetery, but after Poland regained independence in 1918, it became the state cemetery, where some of the most notable people of the period were buried, regardless of their faith.

A large part of the cemetery is occupied by graves of Polish soldiers who died in the Warsaw Uprising. Most of the graves were exhumed between 1945 and 1953 from the streets of Warsaw. In many cases, the names of the soldiers remain unknown, and the graves are marked only by the Polish Red Cross identification number. Until the early 1950s, brothers-in-arms of many dead soldiers organised exhumations of their colleagues on their own, and there are many quarters where soldiers of specific units are buried. Also in the cemetery are several mass graves of (mostly unknown) civilian victims of the German terror during World War II, especially during the Warsaw Uprising.  There are mass graves of political prisoners executed during the Stalinist period, which lie under the graves of Communist figures.  It took a change in the law to enable researchers to begin the recovery of these remains. As of August 2015, that work was ongoing.

In 1964, communist authorities renamed the cemetery to "Communal Cemetery". The traditional name was restored in 1998.

Notable burials
Those buried at the cemetery include:

 Magdalena Abakanowicz (1930–2017), sculptor
 Henryk Arctowski (1871–1958), geologist and explorer
 Grażyna Bacewicz (1909–1969), composer
 Krzysztof Kamil Baczyński (1921–1944), Home Army soldier and poet
 Władysław Bartoszewski (1922–2015), politician, social activist, journalist, writer and historian
 Józef Beck (1894–1944), politician
 Zygmunt Berling (1896–1980), general and politician
 Bolesław Bierut (1892–1956), Polish President, Prime Minister and communist leader
 Jan Brzechwa (1898–1966), poet
 Jan Bytnar (1921–1943), Home Army soldier and anti-Nazi resistance fighter
 Grzegorz Ciechowski (1957–2001), musician
 Józef Cyrankiewicz (1911–1989), communist leader
 Kazimierz Deyna (1947–1989), footballer
 Xawery Dunikowski (1875–1964), sculptor and painter
 Adolf Dymsza (1900–1975), actor
 Wojciech Fangor (1922–2015), painter and graphic artist
 Emil August Fieldorf (1895–1953), general and WWII hero
 Konstanty Ildefons Gałczyński (1905–1953), poet
 Bronisław Geremek (1932–2008), politician and social historian
 Władysław Gomułka (1905–1982), communist leader
 Kazimierz Górski  (1921–2006), football coach
 Leopold Infeld (1898–1968), physicist
 Stefania Jabłońska (1920–2017), scientist
 Alina Janowska (1923–2017), actress
 Wojciech Jaruzelski (1923–2014), communist leader
 Jan Kapela (1931–1987), politician
 Ryszard Kapuściński (1932–2007), journalist
 Leszek Kołakowski (1927–2009), philosopher
 Władysław Komar (1940–1998), athlete
 Tadeusz Konwicki (1926–2015), writer
 Kazimierz Kuratowski (1896–1980), mathematician
 Jacek Kuroń (1934–2004), anti-communist activist
 Stefan Kuryłowicz (1949–2011), architect
 Oskar Lange (1904–1965), economist
 Tadeusz Łomnicki (1927–1992), actor
 Stanisław Mazur (1905–1981), mathematician
 Grzegorz Miecugow (1955–2017), media personality
 Zofia Nałkowska (1884–1954), novelist
 Jan Olszewski (1930–2019), politician
 Maria Ossowska (1896–1974), sociologist
 Marian Rejewski (1905–1980), mathematician and cryptologist
 Zbigniew Religa (1938–2009), surgeon and politician
 Michał Rola-Żymierski (1890–1989), communist leader and marshal of Poland
 Tadeusz Ross (1938–2021), actor and politician
 Leon Schiller (1887–1954), theatre director
 Kamila Skolimowska (1982–2009), athlete
 Walery Sławek (1879–1939), politician
 Piotr Sobociński (1958–2001), cinematographer
 Stanisław Sosabowski (1892–1967), WWII general
 Tomasz Stańko (1942–2018), jazz musician
 Henryk Stażewski (1894–1988), painter
 Aleksander Sulkiewicz (1867–1916), politician
 Jerzy Szacki (1929–2016), sociologist
 Danuta Szaflarska (1915–2017), actress
 Irena Szewińska (1946–2018), athlete
 Władysław Szpilman (1911–2000), pianist and composer
 Leonid Teliga (1917–1970), sailor
 Julian Tuwim (1894–1953), poet
 Jerzy Urban (1933–2022), journalist, publicist, columnist, writer, communist, spokesman for the Council of Ministers of the Polish People's Republic
 Witold Woyda (1939–2008), fencer
 Jan Zumbach (1915–1986), WWII fighter pilot and flying ace

Gallery

See also
 Powązki Cemetery
 Rakowicki Cemetery
 Lychakiv Cemetery

References

External links 

 
 Comprehensive information at the Cmentarium website

Cemeteries in Warsaw
Military memorials and cemeteries in Poland
Żoliborz